In India, a Constitutional body is a body or institute established by the Constitution of India. They can only be created or changed by passing a constitutional amendment bill, rather than an Act of Parliament.

The members of Constituent Assembly of India recognised the need for independent institutions which can regulate sectors of national importance without any executive interference. As such, they introduced constitutional provisions, paving the way for creation of Constitutional bodies. A classic example of a constitutional body is the Election Commission of India, which is created to conduct and regulate the national and state elections in India.

A Constitutional body has either complete independence or functional independence when discharging their constitutional obligations. In India, typically members of such constitutional bodies can only removed by a 2/3 rd majority vote in both houses of Parliament.

Lists of constitutional bodies from article 76 to 350B

See also 
 Constitutional body

References 

Government of India